The 2001 Southern Conference baseball tournament was held at Joseph P. Riley Jr. Park in Charleston, South Carolina, from May 22 through 25. Second seeded The Citadel won the tournament and earned the Southern Conference's automatic bid to the 2001 NCAA Division I baseball tournament. It was the Bulldogs sixth tournament win.

The tournament used a double-elimination format. Only the top eight teams participate, so Wofford, Davidson, and VMI were not in the field.

Seeding

Bracket

All-Tournament Team

References 

Tournament
Southern Conference Baseball Tournament
Southern Conference Baseball
Southern Conference baseball tournament